Molybdenum disilicide (MoSi2, or molybdenum silicide), an intermetallic compound, a silicide of molybdenum, is a refractory ceramic with primary use in heating elements. It has moderate density, melting point 2030 °C, and is electrically conductive. At high temperatures it forms a passivation layer of silicon dioxide, protecting it from further oxidation. The thermal stability of MoSi2 alongside its high emissivity make this material, alongside WSi2 attractive for applications as a high emissivity coatings in heat shields for atmospheric entry. 
MoSi2 is a gray metallic-looking material with tetragonal crystal structure (alpha-modification); its beta-modification is hexagonal and unstable. It is insoluble in most acids but soluble in nitric acid and hydrofluoric acid.

While MoSi2 has excellent resistance to oxidation and high Young's modulus at temperatures above 1000 °C, it is brittle in lower temperatures. Also, at above 1200 °C it loses creep resistance. These properties limits its use as a structural material, but may be offset by using it together with another material as a composite material.

Molybdenum disilicide and MoSi2-based materials are usually made by sintering. Plasma spraying can be used for producing its dense monolithic and composite forms; material produced this way may contain a proportion of β-MoSi2 due to its rapid cooling.

Molybdenum disilicide heating elements can be used for temperatures up to 1800 °C, in electric furnaces used in laboratory and production environment in production of glass, steel, electronics, ceramics, and in heat treatment of materials. While the elements are brittle, they can operate at high power without aging, and their electrical resistivity does not increase with operation time. Their maximum operating temperature has to be lowered in atmospheres with low oxygen content due to breakdown of the passivation layer.

Other ceramic materials used for heating elements include silicon carbide, barium titanate, and lead titanate composite materials.

Molybdenum disilicide is used in microelectronics as a contact material. It is often used as a shunt over polysilicon lines to increase their conductivity and increase signal speed.

References

Ceramic materials
Group 6 silicides
Molybdenum(II) compounds
Refractory materials
Semiconductor materials